Entsuji may refer to
 4272 Entsuji, a main-belt asteroid
 Entsu-ji, a temple in Kyoto